Ministry of Construction or Department of Construction may refer to:

Department of Construction, former government department of Australia
Ministry of Construction of the People's Republic of China, a government department of China
Ministry of Construction (Burma), a government department of Burma
Ministry of Construction (Israel), a government department of Israel
Ministry of Construction (Soviet Union), a government department in the former Soviet Union
Ministry of Construction (Japan), a government ministry of Japan which in 2001 merged into the Ministry of Land, Infrastructure, Transport and Tourism